This list is of the Cultural Properties of Japan designated in the category of  for the Prefecture of Okinawa.

National Cultural Properties
As of 1 January 2015, two Important Cultural Properties have been designated, being of national significance.

Prefectural Cultural Properties
As of 1 May 2014, fifty-two properties have been designated at a prefectural level.

Municipal Cultural Properties
As of 1 May 2014, sixty-five properties have been designated at a municipal level.

See also
 Cultural Properties of Japan
 List of National Treasures of Japan (crafts: swords)
 List of National Treasures of Japan (crafts: others)
 List of Intangible Cultural Properties of Japan (Okinawa)
 Ryukyuan lacquerware
 Museums in Okinawa Prefecture

References

External links
  Ryukyu Cultural Archives
  Cultural Properties in Okinawa Prefecture
  List of Cultural Properties in Okinawa Prefecture

Cultural Properties - Crafts
Crafts,Okinawa